Rudderville is an unincorporated community near Franklin in Williamson County, Tennessee. It is the location of Fred J. Page High School.

References

Unincorporated communities in Williamson County, Tennessee
Unincorporated communities in Tennessee